Mesivta (also 'metivta'; Aramaic: מתיבתא, "academy") is an Orthodox Jewish yeshiva secondary school for boys. The term is commonly used in the United States to describe a yeshiva that emphasizes Talmudic studies for boys in grades 9 through 11 or 12; alternately, it refers to the religious studies track in a yeshiva high school that offers both religious and secular studies.

The comparable term in Israel for the former is Yeshiva Ketana (lit. "small yeshiva"), for the latter Yeshiva Tichonit (ישיבה תיכונית,  "yeshiva high-school").
This article focuses on the US;
see Chinuch Atzmai and Mamlachti dati for respective discussion of these Israeli institutions.

After graduation from a mesivta, students progress to a beth midrash, or undergraduate-level, yeshiva program. In practice, yeshivas that call themselves mesivtas are usually a combination of mesivta (high-school) and beth medrash (post-high-school) programs. Students in the beth medrash program are often called upon to mentor those in the mesivta.

History

In Talmudic and Geonic eras
The term metivta first appears in the Talmud, where it refers to a yeshiva of Talmudic sages. Abba Arika learned in the metivta in Sepphoris under Judah the Prince, his son, and grandson. Under the leadership of Rav and Samuel of Nehardea, the Talmudic Academy of Sura during the Babylonian Exile was called a sidra, but under Rav Huna, the second dean of the Academy of Sura, the yeshiva began to be called a metivta and Huna was the first to hold the title of resh metivta (corresponding to rosh yeshiva). According to Graetz, the metivta convened in certain months of the year. Metivta frameworks continued to operate throughout the era of the Geonim, a period of approximately 1000 years.

Modern-day concept
The dual curriculum high school was pioneered by the Manhattan Talmudical Academy of Yeshiva University (now known as Marsha Stern Talmudical Academy) in 1916; 
 Tachkemoni was active in Poland and then Israel at approximately that time; 
ALMA was established in Jerusalem in 1936, and "ha-Yishuv" in Tel Aviv in 1937.
See .

As regards the more intensive Talmudic studies program, 
Rabbi Shraga Feivel Mendlowitz introduced the concept of a mesivta for boys aged 14 and older in New York in 1926. Until that time, religious boys attended Talmud Torah (elementary school) until their bar mitzvah and then went on to public high school and college, where their level of Torah observance and commitment were sorely tested. The only post-bar mitzvah religious education available at the time was at Yeshivat Rabbeinu Yitzchak Elchonon's Talmudical Academy (founded 1916), which prepared students for a career in the rabbinate. When Mendlowitz, who had begun teaching at the Yeshiva Torah Vodaas elementary school in 1923, suggested the innovation, he was met with widespread resistance. An editorial in the Yiddish Morgen Journal stated:

With the support of three Torah Vodaas board members – Binyomin Wilhelm, Ben Zion Weberman, and Abraham Lewin – Mendlowitz successfully opened Mesivta Torah Vodaas in its own building in Williamsburg, Brooklyn, in September 1926. The mesivta opened with four classes of post-bar mitzvah students and 11 students in the advanced, beth midrash program. The mesivta went on to graduate generations of students who became Torah scholars and leaders in the American Jewish world.

Mendlowitz also influenced the administration at Yeshivas Chaim Berlin to expand beyond eighth grade and open a mesivta as well. Mesivta Rabbi Chaim Berlin opened in the 1930s. Other mesivtas founded in the 1930s and 1940s were Mesivta Tifereth Jerusalem, Kaminetzer Mesivta of Boro Park, and Rabbi Jacob Joseph School. In the 1950s, the latter four mesivtas had their own basketball league.

In 1937 Mendlowitz founded Camp Mesivta, the first yeshiva summer camp in America, in Ferndale, New York. This became the summer camp of choice for thousands of students from other yeshivas and a prototype for yeshiva learning camps in later decades. Mendlowitz instituted the practice of inviting Gedolim to visit the camp for a few days or a few weeks, giving campers the experience of seeing Torah greats in action. The Gedolim who regularly stayed at Camp Mesivta included Rabbi Yaakov Kamenetsky, Rabbi Shlomo Heiman, Rabbi Moshe Feinstein, and Rabbi Avraham Kalmanowitz. Camp Mesivta operated until the early 1960s; in 1966, it was succeeded by Camp Ohr Shraga-Beis Medrash LeTorah in Greenfield Park, New York, headed by Rabbi Zelik Epstein and Rabbi Nesanel Quinn.

Today
Today mesivtas are located in cities throughout the United States that have a sizable Orthodox Jewish population. Since the 1980s, the number of mesivtas in the New York/New Jersey area has mushroomed. Whereas before there were at most a handful of schools to choose from, today every city with a religious Jewish population and nearly every township has a yeshiva high school. Because of the proliferation, mesivtas have developed reputations that reflect the academic level of their students. There are schools for metzuyanim (top learners), schools for average students, and schools for students with "serious scholastic and/or yirat shamayim (religious belief) challenges". Some mesivtas operate different "tracks" to satisfy a diverse student body.

Mesivtas, like yeshivas, do not follow the public education schedule of terms and vacations, but organize the school year according to the Hebrew calendar. School is in recess during Jewish holidays, and the term ends in the month of Av, the traditional break for yeshivas since the days of the Talmud. There is also a dress code: whereas in elementary school, boys wear more casual clothes to school, upon entering mesivta, they are expected to dress in dark pants and white shirts.

See also
 Bais Yaakov
 Jewish education
 List of mesivtas
 List of Modern Orthodox Jewish day schools
 Yeshiva Gedolah

References

Sources
Astor, Yaakov. "Harry Herskowitz: A legend who made a different world and a world of difference" in Daring To Dream: Profiles in the growth of the American Torah community, Agudath Israel of America, May 2003, pp. 16–45.

External links
 Mesivtas of Greater America Official Website

Aramaic words and phrases
Jewish education
Jewish educational institutions
Orthodox yeshivas
 
Aramaic words and phrases in Jewish prayers and blessings